Toonami was a British children's channel which aired from September 2003 to May 2007.

History

Pre-Launch
Toonami was a programming block on Cartoon Network, until June 2002 when its programming was moved to the soon-to-be launched CNX, a new channel launched by Cartoon Network UK, the first Cartoon Network derivative to launch outside North America. CNX did not function like Turner's other kids channels, instead operating as a general entertainment network with children's programming during the day and more adult programming at night, which included martial arts movies, adult-oriented animation like the Adult Swim originals, and dramas like The Shield and Birds of Prey.

At the beginning of 2003, the channel introduced a Toonami programming strand for CNX's daytime hours.

Launch
On 9 July 2003, Turner announced that a standalone Toonami channel would replace CEX beginning in September 2003 and move to the kids section on the EPG, with a Turner spokesperson citing that the adult market being "crowded and competitive" as the reason for CEX's closure.

On 1 September, it was officially announced that CNX would rebrand as Toonami on 9 September, and on that day, CNX's slot on Sky Digital and NTL was moved to the "Kids" sections and relabelled as Toonami, which launched at 6 am on that day.
However, TOM (who was TOM 2, despite America already having switched to TOM 3) was not voiced by Steven Blum (minus when Lockdown aired on the channel in 2003), instead given a new voice actor: Christian Stevenson, otherwise known as DJ BBQ. Stevenson earlier hosted the CNX show Trailer Park alongside Ed Leigh. Previously, when Toonami was still a block on Cartoon Network UK, the block used TOM 1 and had a voice similar to Tansit from Space Ghost Coast to Coast narrating in its bumpers, which many fans believed to be TOM's voice.

In 2005, Toonami was added to the TV and video on demand kids' package for VNL's HomeChoice (now TalkTalk TV). Broadcasting for the channel involved using advanced MPEG-4 compression technology, the first TV channel in the world to do so.

On 6 March 2006, Toonami changed its focus from action cartoons to entertainment in general, as the channel moved to Sky 602 and began airing five live-action shows: Backyard Science, Parker Lewis Can't Lose, Stencil, Hangin' with Mr. Cooper and Life with Derek. Additionally, the entire design of the channel was overhauled, with the stark, simplistic black, white and red logos replaced with blue, as well as the introduction of giggling, blob-like mascots that populate the advertisement bumpers and channel idents.

Merger with Cartoon Network Too
On 2 May 2007, Turner announced that Toonami would cease operations on 24 May 2007 and its EPG slot would be taken over by Cartoon Network Too. This was to allow a full-time Cartoonito channel to launch in Cartoon Network Too's original slot on Sky. On May 24, Toonami ceased operations at 3:00 am and Cartoon Network Too moved into the space shortly afterwards.

2006 power outage

On the night of 26–27 July 2006 Cartoon Network Too, along with its sister channels, suffered a major technical fault due to a power cut in Soho, London, owing to the 2006 European heat wave, with thunderstorms taking full force overnight.

The power cut caused a mix-up of Turner Broadcasting System Europe channels (i.e. Cartoon Network being broadcast on Boomerang and Toonami, with Boomerang being broadcast on Cartoon Network Too). Boomerang +1 was off-air for some time, while TCM, reverted between TCM France and other programming during the times it was able to provide a service.

TCM 2 remained unaffected due to its downtime of time-sharing. Most advertising was suspended and several of the channel websites were offline also. Those who could still receive the channels had a backup transmission played out, making people confused when Cartoon Network Too and Boomerang were showing episodes of The Flintstones at the same time. These backups where played out with a scrolling message which said "We apologise for the disruption to this programme due to technical problems, and we are trying to correct the fault. We will resume normal programming as soon as possible" in multiple languages.

Whilst most channels returned to the air within 5–10 minutes, it took longer for Cartoon Network Too to resume programming, and it was also joked on various animation based forums by Toonami UK viewers, many of whom have made note of their disdain for the direction in which Turner took the brand in the UK, that the backup transmission was more entertaining, purely due to the lack of live action programming aired during the outage.

The idents on Toonami which aired between shows during the power cut displayed the message "Sorry! Toonami is broken, we'll be right back as soon as we fix it.". These idents have since been re-used in disclaimers warning viewers not to try stunts on various shows at home.

Idents
When the channel launched in 2003, the idents would be the Toonami logo in the Sensor Room, or TOM's face, with a voice whispering Toonami. There were also bumpers in the Sensor Room showcasing the latest games, movies, and shows, with TOM displaying the awkward and dorky personality he was known for on the US Toonami. Sara was also in these bumpers, serving as the straight man to TOM's excited demeanor.

Toonami rebranded in 2004 and got rid of TOM. The idents were on a pale cyan background (alike Cartoonito's) and were based on CNX's idents. They had a black rectangle filling up with white before the white part turned into the Toonami logo.

In 2006, Toonami rebranded for the final time using the logo in an azure background and colored monsters which would play with the Toonami logo. The shutdown ident on the website was the Toonami logo, with the "Too" part pushing away the "nami" and the logo changing into the Cartoon Network Too logo on the same background from the 2004 idents.

Programming
Backyard Science
Batman: The Animated Series
Batman of the Future
Beyblade
Blue Water High
Code Lyoko
 Dragon Ball
 Dragon Ball GT
 Dragon Ball Z
Duel Masters
 Hangin' with Mr. Cooper
 He-Man and the Masters of the Universe
 Justice League
 Justice League Unlimited
 Kong: The Animated Series
 Life with Derek
 Megas XLR
 One Piece
 Parker Lewis Can't Lose
 Pokémon
 Rave Master
 Samurai Jack
 Star Wars: Clone Wars
 Static Shock
 Stencil
 Teen Titans
 The Big O
 Transformers: Energon
 Ultimate muscle
 X-Men: Evolution

See also 
 Cartoon Network (British and Irish TV channel)
 CNX
 Cartoon Network Too
 Adult Swim (UK & Ireland)

References

External links 
 Official site
 Toonami from Turner info site

Toonami
Children's television channels in the United Kingdom
Defunct television channels in the United Kingdom
Television channels and stations established in 2003
Television channels and stations disestablished in 2007
Warner Bros. Discovery EMEA